The town of Lauter lies in the district of Erzgebirgskreis in the Free State of Saxony, Germany, between the two towns of Aue and Schwarzenberg. It lies in the Ore Mountains, 4 km southeast of Aue, and 4 km northwest of Schwarzenberg, has 4,927 inhabitants (as of 31 December 2006) in an area of 21.55 km² and belongs to the Town League of Silberberg (Städtebund Silberberg). Since 1 January 2013, it is part of the town Lauter-Bernsbach.

Through the town runs the Silver Road, the B 101. Lauter has a station on the Zwickau–Schwarzenberg railway and is served by Regionalbahn trains, operated by Erzgebirgsbahn (a subsidiary of Deutsche Bahn) between Zwickau and Johanngeorgenstadt.

History 
The town arose from a forest village (Waldhufendorf) established in the late 12th century on the western ridge of the Schwarzwasser Valley. The name is recorded over the centuries as  Lawther (1460),  Lawte (1501) and  Lauttera (1590). The town draws this name from a brook called die Lauter, although this name is now no longer used for any waterway.

Besides agriculture and log driving, mining and basket making afforded the population livelihoods. When industrialization began in the 19th century, many machine factories, and metal- and woodworking businesses as well as an enamel factory set up shop in town. From 1952 to 1990, Lauter was part of the Bezirk Karl-Marx-Stadt of East Germany. Town rights were conferred in 1962.

In the early 1950s, the BSG Empor Lauter football club played successfully in the DDR-Oberliga, until it was delegated to Rostock in 1954. Its successor club Hansa Rostock played in the Bundesliga.

Population development 
The following figures refer to 31 December in each given year.

 Source: Statistisches Landesamt des Freistaates Sachsen

Famous people 
 Edwin Bauersachs (1893–1948), Ore Mountain “homeland poet” (Heimatdichter), was active in Lauter from 1919 to 1945
 Steffi Martin (1962-2017), two-time Olympic medallist in luge, lived here

Sons and daughters of the town 
 Johann Georg Rachalß (1630–1671), Saxony’s chief forester
 Walter Weidauer (1899–1986), from 1946 to 1958 Mayor of Dresden
 Werner Krusche (1917–2009), Evangelical German theologian and Bishop of the Evangelical Church of the Church Province of Saxony

References

External links 
 Town’s website

Former municipalities in Saxony